Great Lakes Hockey League may refer to:

Great Lakes Hockey League (adult), an adult hockey league in Michigan and Wisconsin
Great Lakes Hockey League (Ohio), Ohio ice hockey athletic conference